Petr Hladík (born 28 September 1984) is a Czech politician who has served as Czech Minister of the Environment in Petr Fiala's Cabinet since March 2023. He is also deputy chairman of the Christian and Democratic Union – Czechoslovak People's Party (KDU-ČSL) since March 2019. 

In 2012–2015 he served as chairman of the Young Populars. From 2016 he was deputy mayor of Brno. He was elected as deputy leader of KDU-ČSL in 2019. He is a member of the municipal council of Brno.

References 

1984 births
Living people
People from Žďár nad Sázavou District
KDU-ČSL Government ministers
Masaryk University alumni
Environment ministers of the Czech Republic